Abdramane Ouattara (born 31 December 1986) is a Burkinabé professional football player who plays for Étoile Filante.

Career 
Ouattara began his career in the youth from ASFA Yennenga and signed in 2003 his profi contract with ASF Bobo. He played four years for the club in the Burkinabé Premier League, before joined in summer 2006 to his current club Étoile Filante.

International 
Ouattara holds for the Burkina Faso national football team four games, he played his first game on 5 June 2004 and the last on 9 October 2004.

References

External links
 

1986 births
Burkinabé footballers
Living people
ASFA Yennenga players
Burkina Faso international footballers
Étoile Filante de Ouagadougou players
People from Bobo-Dioulasso
Association football defenders
ASF Bobo Dioulasso players
21st-century Burkinabé people